Point Township is one of ten townships in Posey County, Indiana. As of the 2000 census, its population was 497. The lowest, the southernmost, and the westernmost points in Indiana are all located along the township's boundaries.

History
Point Township was organized in 1822. The township was so named for the fact the southernmost point in the county and state is contained within its borders.

The Ashworth Archaeological Site, Hovey Lake Archaeological District, and Murphy Archeological Site are listed on the National Register of Historic Places.

Adjacent Townships
 Indiana
 Posey County
 Black Township (North)
 Illinois
 Gallatin County
 New Haven Township (West)
 White County
 Emma Township (Northwest)
 Kentucky
 Union County
 Uniontown District

Unincorporated Places
Hovey
Oak Grove

Archaeology
Point Township is the location of many significant archaeological sites.  Among the leading ones are Ashworth in the township's northeast, Bone Bank along the Wabash River in the west, and Murphy, Hovey Lake-Klein, and Welborn in the south central.

References

External links
 Indiana Township Association
 United Township Association of Indiana

Townships in Posey County, Indiana
Townships in Indiana